TAPI-1 ( TNF-alpha protease inhibitor I) is a structural analog of TAPI-0 with similar but more stable validness in vitro for the matrix metalloproteinases (MMPs) and TNF- alpha converting enzyme which blocks shedding of several cell surface proteins such as IL-6 and p60 TNF receptor.

References

TNF inhibitors
Hydroxamic acids
2-Naphthyl compounds